

Great Britain
 Bermuda –  Henry Pulleine, Governor of Bermuda (1713–1718)
 Massachusetts – Joseph Dudley, Governor of Massachusetts Bay Colony (1702–1715)

Oman
 Mombasa – Nasr ibn Abdallah al-Mazru‘i, Wali of Mombasa (1698–1728)

Netherlands
 Dutch East Indies – Christoffel van Swoll, Governor-General of the Dutch East Indies (1713–1718)
 Zeylan – Hendrik Bekker, Governor of Zeylan (1707–1716)

Portugal
 Angola – João Manuel de Noronha, Governor of Angola (1713–1717)
 Macau –
 Antonio de Sequeira de Noronha, Governor of Macau (1711–1714)
 D.Francisco de Alarcao Sotto-Maior, Governor of Macau (1714–1718)

Colonial governors
Colonial governors
1714